Nikola Dujaković (born 27 June 1996) is a Bosnian professional footballer who plays as a midfielder for Bosnian Premier League club Leotar.

Club career
Starting his career at hometown club Borac Banja Luka, Dujaković made his debut for the club in 2015 in the Bosnian Premier League. He then joined, at the time, First League of RS club Krupa. In the 2015–16, with Krupa, Dujaković won the club's first ever and historic First League of RS title and got promoted to the Bosnian Premier League. With the club, he also became a Bosnian Cup runner-up in the 2017–18 season, losing against Željezničar in the final.

Dujaković got relegated with Krupa back to the First League of RS in the 2018–19 season, but got promoted back to the Bosnian Premier League in the next season, though after the season was ended abruptly due to the COVID-19 pandemic in Bosnia and Herzegovina, after which, by default, Krupa were crowned league champions and got promoted.

In July 2021, he left Krupa and returned to Borac.

International career
From 2017 until 2018, Dujaković represented the Bosnia and Herzegovina U21 national team, making one appearance.

Honours
Krupa
First League of RS: 2015–16, 2019–20
Bosnian Cup runner-up: 2017–18

References

External links
Nikola Dujaković at Sofascore

1996 births
Living people
Sportspeople from Banja Luka
Serbs of Bosnia and Herzegovina
Bosnia and Herzegovina footballers
Premier League of Bosnia and Herzegovina players
First League of the Republika Srpska players
FK Borac Banja Luka players
FK Krupa players
FK Leotar players
Bosnia and Herzegovina under-21 international footballers
Association football midfielders